Noella "Noelle" Uloko (born April 26, 1989) is a Nigerian contemporary Christian singer-songwriter and recording artist from Benue State.

References 

Urban contemporary gospel musicians
Living people
Nigerian gospel singers
Nigerian Christians
1989 births
21st-century Nigerian women  singers